Free Thinking is a radio programme broadcast on BBC Radio 3 as part of its "After Dark" late night programming. The programme is a rebranded version of  Night Waves, "Radio 3's flagship arts and ideas programme". Night Waves was broadcast every Monday to Thursday evening, except during the Proms season. 

BBC Radio 3 rebranded Night Waves as Free Thinking from 7 January 2014, and reduced the number of first-time broadcasts per week from four to three (plus one repeat).

Format
Programmes usually included a mix of interviews, reviews, previews, discussions, commissioned writing and reports. Some episodes included a single interview with a prominent figure in the worlds of arts or ideas. The programme's presenters include Matthew Sweet, Philip Dodd, Rana Mitter, Shahidha Bari and Anne McElvoy.

Reception
The Guardian said in May 2010 "...the king of radio arts programmes is undoubtedly Night Waves, a programme so clever that it regularly makes me stand still and listen, usually halfway to the dishwasher with a plate in my hand...It's the desire to untangle arguments, to lift up their corners and see what lurks there. There's a gleeful range of references too...and a relish for intelligent debate."

References

External links

BBC Radio 3 programmes
1992 radio programme debuts